Yogurtland  is an American international frozen yogurt franchise headquartered in Irvine, California, United States. Yogurtland provides self-serve frozen yogurt with active cultures, as well as other frozen desserts such as ice cream, sorbet and plant-based treats that cater to a variety of dietary preferences. Yogurtland has stores in ten states  in the United States and also several other countries such as United Arab Emirates, Guam, Oman, Indonesia, and Thailand. The yogurt chain is considered the pioneers of the self-serve format, which gives guests the opportunity to customize their flavors and toppings.

History
Yogurtland was founded in February 2006 by Phillip Chang, who is also the chain's CEO. The first Yogurtland location was in Fullerton, CA. Yogurtland is the leading self-serve frozen yogurt franchise in the United States and was the first frozen yogurt company known to add fresh fruit to the toppings bar.

In its over 15 year history, Yogurtland has truly had a global presence with locations at one point or another in Venezuela, Australia, Guam, United Arab Emirates, Oman, Singapore, Indonesia and Thailand. On January 28, 2014, Yogurtland opened its first store in the Middle East at Dubai Mall in Dubai, UAE. Yogurtland entered into Sultanate of Oman on February 10, 2018 at Muscat City Centre. On November 9, 2019, Yogurtland opened its first store in Indonesia at Lippo Mall Puri in West Jakarta. Yogurtland has been expanded via franchising which includes over 100 franchise partners.

In 2016, Yogurtland partnered with Kung Fu Panda and Candy Crush. It distributed collectible spoons of the different characters or icons to be released weekly and released exclusive flavors related to the partnership.

Due to the coronavirus pandemic, Yogurtland temporarily suspended its indoor dining in March 2020 and expanded its digital offerings through carryout and delivery.

On November 14, 2020, Yogurtland opened the doors to its first brand-new fast casual concept called Holsom by Yogurtland in Huntington Beach, CA. The opening marked the company’s first location in California and its first fast-casual eatery concept nationwide. Holsom by Yogurtland  focuses on bringing an innovative menu of experiential flavors with high quality ingredients and chef-crafted better-for-you meal options at an approachable price. Menu items  include wholesome grain bowls and gourmet toasts that complement the handcrafted beverages and Yogurtland’s signature frozen yogurt and toppings.

In the summer of 2021, Yogurtland brought menu innovation to its guests with the launch of limited-time fruit bowl fusions and acai bowls. In March 2021, the brand gave fans its first-ever oat milk flavor with the launch of plant-based cinnamon oatmeal cookie.

Products
At any time, Yogurtland stores have up to 16 flavors in rotation. Flavors are created by Yogurtland’s team of Flavorologists who source the best ingredients for the most authentic tasting flavors out there and are part of the yogurt-making process from start to finish.  The Flavorologists are responsible for more than 200 flavors like Rocket Pop Sorbet, Dragon Passion Tart, Salted Caramel Pecan, and Plant-Based Piña Colada.

Customers may mix and combine flavors in their cups by pulling on handles that control the yogurt machines. Generally, Yogurtland provides an array of dietary offerings in its flavor options including dairy-free, sugar-free, low fat, non-fat, gluten-free and vegan. Additionally, approximately 30 toppings, including fresh-cut fruits, chocolate bits, gummies, cookies, nuts, granola and syrups are available at the toppings bar to complement the frozen yogurt.  Cost for products vary by ounce with the price ranging from per ounce depending on the location.

Customer Experience
In May 2021, Yogurtland revamped its customer experience to bring customers an enhanced convenient and customized experienced through an update of its rewards program, mobile app, and online ordering capabilities.

The Yogurtland Rewards Program offers member benefits such as earning two points for every dollar spent, a $5 reward for every 100 points earned, a free birthday treat, three new Rewards tiers, and 50 bonus points when you sign up.

Guests can order online on the Yogurtland website or app for delivery, in-store pickup, or catering. The digital optimizations allow Yogurtland guests to order easily and safely from the comfort of home without compromising the Yogurtland experience of creating a unique treat. Additionally, the new mobile app features include in-app ordering, quick access to your account and transaction history, adding Yogurtland gift cards to your account as a payment option, creating and viewing favorite orders, and tracking your progress towards the next reward.

See also
 List of frozen dessert brands
 List of frozen yogurt companies

References

External links
 

Companies based in Anaheim, California
Restaurants established in 2006
Fast-food franchises
Fast-food chains of the United States
Ice cream parlors
Brand name frozen desserts
Frozen yogurt businesses
2006 establishments in California